Sphegina elongata is a species of hoverfly in the family Syrphidae.

Distribution
Japan.

References

Eristalinae
Insects described in 1953
Diptera of Asia